The Woman Who Did is a 1915 British silent drama film directed by Walter West and starring Eve Balfour, Thomas H. MacDonald and George Foley. It was adapted from the 1895 novel The Woman Who Did by Grant Allen. It follows the life of Herminia Barton, a Cambridge-educated woman as she tries to make it in the world by herself.

Cast
 Eve Balfour   
 Thomas H. MacDonald   
 George Foley   
 Lily Saxby

References

External links

1915 films
1915 drama films
British drama films
1910s English-language films
Films directed by Walter West
Films based on Canadian novels
Films set in England
British silent feature films
British black-and-white films
1910s British films
Silent drama films